The Cape Ann Light Station on Thacher Island, off Cape Ann in Rockport, Massachusetts, is nationally significant as the last light station to be established under colonial rule and the first station in the United States to mark a navigational hazard rather than a harbor entrance. The current pair of lighthouses were built in 1861.

After being decommissioned in the early 1980s, the lens from the south tower was moved to the U.S. Coast Guard Museum at the United States Coast Guard Academy in New London, Connecticut. In 2013 a joint effort by the Cape Ann Museum and the Thacher Island Association brought the lens back to Cape Ann. The first order lens is now on display at the Cape Ann Museum in Gloucester, Massachusetts.

When these lights were built, there was no way to produce a flashing light and, occasionally mariners would confuse one light for another with disastrous results.  The only way to create a distinction was to build more than one light.  There were two lights at Plymouth and three at Nauset Beach. Gradually as it became possible to create flashes with a revolving lens system, the multiple lights were discontinued, so that while the south light is an active, Coast Guard maintained light, the north tower was discontinued in 1932. It was relighted as a Private Aid to Navigation in 1989. Both lights are now owned by the Town of Rockport and managed by the Thacher Island Association.

The station was added to the National Register of Historic Places as Twin Lights Historic District – Cape Ann Light Station on October 7, 1971, reference number 71000355. In 2001 they became the 9th light station to be recognized as a National Historic Landmark.

Cape Ann Light
Cape Ann Light is the southernmost of the two lighthouses that comprise the station.

Thacher Island North Light
Thacher Island North Light is the northernmost of the two lighthouses that comprise the station.

Nomenclature

The south light's official name in the US Coast Guard Light List is Cape Ann Light, number 1-295.
The north light's official name is Thacher Island North Light, number 1-305.
The National Historic Landmark listing name is Twin Lights Historic District – Cape Ann Light Station.
The lights are known locally as the Twin Lights or Thacher Island Lights.

See also
National Register of Historic Places listings in Essex County, Massachusetts

References

Lighthouses completed in 1771
Towers completed in 1771
Lighthouses completed in 1861
Lighthouses on the National Register of Historic Places in Massachusetts
National Historic Landmarks in Massachusetts
National Historic Landmark lighthouses
Rockport, Massachusetts
Lighthouses in Essex County, Massachusetts
National Register of Historic Places in Essex County, Massachusetts
1771 establishments in Massachusetts
Historic districts on the National Register of Historic Places in Massachusetts